Crematogaster corticicola is a species of ant in tribe Crematogastrini. It was described by Mayr in 1887.

References

corticicola
Insects described in 1887